The men's team large hill/4 × 5 km Nordic combined competition for the 2018 Winter Olympics in Pyeongchang, South Korea, was held on 22 February 2018 at the Alpensia Ski Jumping Centre and Alpensia Cross-Country Skiing Centre on 22 February.

Qualification

Using the Olympic Quota Allocation List and Continental Cup Standings, when no athletes remain in the allocation list (which includes results from 1 July 2016 to 21 January  2018), the top 50 athletes were awarded quotas (with maximum of five per country). Only a maximum of one team of four athletes could be entered into the event. The remaining five quotas were given to countries with three athletes to make a team. If a minimum of ten teams were already formed in the first 50, then the remaining five quotas would be allocated to the individual competition.

The qualified teams are:

Results

Ski jumping
The ski jumping was held at 16:30.

Cross-country
The cross-country relay was held at 19:20.

References

Nordic combined at the 2018 Winter Olympics